Beleg ( or Beleg; Montenegrin and Serbian: Белег, Beleg) is a mountain reaching a height of  located on the tripoint of Serbia, Kosovo and Montenegro. Beleg is located a few kilometres north-west of the town of Istok in Kosovo.

Notes

References

Mountains of Kosovo
Accursed Mountains
Two-thousanders of Kosovo